Bendorf is a town in the district of Mayen-Koblenz, in Rhineland-Palatinate, Germany, on the right bank of the Rhine, approx.  north of Koblenz.

Structure of the town
The town consists of the following districts:
Bendorf
Sayn
Mülhofen
Stromberg

Economy
From the 18th century Bendorf was dominated by mining and the metallurgical industry. The most imposing relic of this era is the Sayner Hütte (Sayn mine works). The ores of the Bendorfer mine works came from the Trierischer Loh iron-ore mine. The Rhine port of Bendorf dates from 1900. In addition to handling clay and basalt it has the largest oil-storage facilities between Mainz and Cologne.

Today the former industrial city is home to many retail stores.  Bendorf Focus is an association of traders, the aim of which is to improve the local economy.

The Bendorf Vierwindenhöhe FM radio transmitter is situated on the hill known as Vierwindenhöhe.

In literature
Heinrich Böll's short story Wanderer, kommst du nach Spa... is set in Bendorf.

Personalities 

 Theodor Wiegand (1864-1936), archaeologist
 Hermann Junker (1877-1962), born in Bendorf, egyptologist and Catholic priest
 Georg Bauer (1900-1983), German politician (SPD), Member of Landtag Rhineland-Palatinate, honorary citizen of the city of Bendorf
 Hans Werner Kettenbach (pseudonym:  Christian Ohlig ) (born 1928), journalist, writer and screenwriter
 Hans Müller (born 1949), politician, member of the Schleswig-Holstein State Parliament 2005-2012 (SPD)
 Jutta Nardenbach (1968-2018), soccer player

References

External links

Mayen-Koblenz
Middle Rhine
Districts of the Rhine Province